John William Ford (24 August 1931 – 29 December 2015) was an Australian rules footballer who played with Fitzroy in the Victorian Football League (VFL).

Notes

External links 		
		
		
		
		
		
		
1931 births				
Australian rules footballers from Victoria (Australia)		
Fitzroy Football Club players
Ararat Football Club players
2015 deaths